Coreco Ja'Quan Pearson (born July 31, 2002) is an American conservative activist, political advisor and commentator.

Born in Augusta, Georgia, Pearson was raised in Grovetown. His political interest deepened aged eight, when he began blogging in support of local conservative politicians. He embarked on a career as an internet personality when, in early 2015, he uploaded a video to YouTube defending comments made by former mayor of New York City Rudy Giuliani and criticism of then President Barack Obama, which quickly gained international attention. After this, he began his career as a freelance journalist and has campaigned for several Republican politicians.

Pearson was involved in the unprecedented attempt to overturn the 2020 United States presidential election. A conservative, he describes himself as an anti-establishment populist. Pearson is the executive director of Young Georgians in Government and executive director of Teens for Trump. He is also a political advisor and active in Georgia Republican politics.

Early life and education 
Pearson was born as Coreco Ja'Quan Pearson on July 31, 2002, in Augusta, Georgia, his parents registered Democratic. In 2012, his family moved to Grovetown where Pearson attended Columbia Middle School. He was elected student body president in seventh grade, though he stepped down in order to form the Young Georgians in Government political group and participate in other political activities. In 2016, he started attending Evans High School as a freshman. He lives with his grandparents, Willie and Robin Pearson. He graduated from Evans High School in May 2020.

Career

Political activism 
Pearson first became interested in politics when his first grade class held a mock presidential election, representing that of the 2008 United States presidential election. Pearson states that the class was instructed to research the political views of then-U.S. Senator from Illinois Barack Obama who ran as the Democratic presidential nominee (and who became the 44th U.S. president) and Senator from Arizona John McCain who ran as the Republican presidential nominee. He voted for John McCain in the mock election, because he was inspired by McCain's military service, and began following political news topics. Aged eight, he started blogging in support of different conservative politicians in Georgia and participated in political campaigning in the 2014 United States midterm elections, conducting door-to-door and telephone surveys. After the 2014 midterm elections, Pearson founded a political group named Young Georgians in Government, to involve young people in the "political process and develop solutions for government."

In February 2015, Pearson received international media attention which led him to embark in his career in politics and journalism, after he created a YouTube channel on February 21, 2015, and two days later posted a video, "President Obama: Do you really love America?" in which he defended former mayor of New York City Rudy Giuliani about the comments Giuliani had made criticizing then-President Barack Obama. Pearson also criticized Obama, saying, "If you really did love America, you would call (Islamic State) what it really is: an assault on Christianity, an assault on America and downright hate for the American values that our country holds—freedom of speech, freedom of religion and every single thing that our country stands for."

Pearson, in March 2015, began promoting his own constitutional amendment to lower the age restriction for assuming public office in Georgia to age 18 in the House and age 21 in the Senate. He has acquired seven co-sponsors for the bill, including State Representatives Ben Harbin, Barry Fleming, and Buzz Brockway.

During the 2016 United States presidential election, Pearson campaigned for several different Republican presidential nominees. In April 2015, he campaigned for United States Senator from Kentucky Rand Paul's presidential campaign and said that Paul has a "unique ability" to connect with millennials. Later that year, in September 2015, Pearson left Paul's campaign and joined United States Senator from Texas Ted Cruz's presidential campaign, and Cruz named Pearson as national chairman of "Teens for Ted", with Cruz commenting “Young people are looking for someone who does more than just talk a good game. They want someone who has walked the walk,” Pearson, after Cruz had dropped out, said that he disavowed conservatism. Pearson then endorsed Bernie Sanders and then when Sanders dropped out he joined now-President Donald Trump's presidential campaign as national chairman of Teens for Trump.

In June 2020, Pearson helped raise $160,000 for black-owned businesses that were damaged or destroyed during the protests in Metro Atlanta as the result of the murder of George Floyd.

In July 2020, Pearson started his own nonprofit organization called the Free Thinker Project, a 501(c)(4) group that is allowed to be more partisan than the more typical 501(c)(3), naming himself Founder and President.

He was the campaign manager for Vernon Jones during his 2022 Georgia gubernatorial campaign.

Attempt to overturn 2020 election results
In the 2020 United States presidential election, Pearson was nominated by the Republican Party to serve as an elector for the state of Georgia. However, it is unclear whether he would have served as an elector if president Donald Trump won; The Atlanta Journal-Constitution stated that he did not serve as an elector because his residence was in Alabama while away at college while the Arizona Mirror, Pennsylvania Capital-Star and The Albany Herald list him as one of Trump's alternate electors. Federal investigators announced they were investigating Georgia Republicans who refused to serve as alternative electors and contacted Pearson who said he would cooperate with investigators.

After Joe Biden won the 2020 election, Pearson promoted baseless claims of fraud in the election. In late November, Pearson—represented by right-wing lawyer and former Trump attorney Sidney Powell—sued Georgia Governor Brian Kemp and others in Pearson v. Kemp, a conspiracy-laden lawsuit filed in the federal district court in Atlanta that attempted to overturn Joe Biden's victory in the 2020 presidential election in Georgia. In December 2020, the court dismissed the suit.

Columns 
Pearson's columns have appeared in outlets such as TIME, The Huffington Post, MTV News, The Daily Beast.

Political views 
Over the timeline of Pearson's career, he has changed political views and has changed support from candidate to candidate in the 2016 United States presidential election. Pearson, when first embarking on a political commentator career after the viral YouTube video he made in February 2015, described himself as conservative, in addition to the media.

In November 2015, Pearson changed his political views, and "renounced conservatism" and was questioning the ideology of the Republican Party, stating that "My views on the issues aren't going to be dictated by one political platform or another." In December 2015, Pearson endorsed Senator Bernie Sanders of Vermont, an independent seeking the 2016 Democratic presidential nomination. Later that month, Pearson published an article for MTV criticizing Trump and his presidential campaign and saying that the prospect of a Trump presidency "scares the crap out of me."

In August 2016, Pearson wrote an article for Time magazine in support of Trump, commenting that his political views had changed drastically since 2015. He said that he supported Sanders and now Trump because, in his view, their campaign platforms had a lot of similarity. Pearson describes himself as an anti-establishment populist and is a Christian. However, as of 2018, he describes himself on his Twitter feed as "fighting for a bold conservative future." In 2020, Pearson became a member of the Republican Party when he registered to vote on his eighteenth birthday.

Controversies

White House–Twitter 
On September 23, 2015, Pearson falsely claimed that he was blocked from President Barack Obama's official presidential social media account on Twitter, due to comments he made criticizing Obama for inviting Ahmed Mohamed to the White House after Mohamed was suspended for bringing an invention to school. Official White House assistant press secretary Frank Benenati made a statement that no one has ever been blocked from Obama's account, with other users on Twitter challenging Beneati's statement regarding the matter. Pearson denounced the claim made by the White House, stated that they were lying about him. "They lied about Benghazi," he said, "They lied about the IRS. They lie about every issue of importance to the American people."

Alleged cyberbullying 
In May 2016, Pearson faced disciplinary action for allegedly bullying two white female students in an Instagram group chat. This group chat was deleted before these claims could be thoroughly verified. Pearson claims his actions were retaliation for several comments, some of which were sexual in nature, and that the two girls were "the real bullies".  Pearson posted a video on YouTube urging his supporters to contact the Columbia County School District on his behalf. Pearson faced suspension for the remainder of the school year after attending a disciplinary hearing.

See also 
 Black conservatism in the United States
 Jonathan Krohn – as a minor was also notable as a conservative activist

Notes

References

External links 
 Official website
 CJ Pearson on Twitter
 CJ Pearson on The Huffington Post

Living people
2002 births
American child activists
Journalists from Georgia (U.S. state)
African-American journalists
21st-century American journalists
American activist journalists
American political activists
American political commentators
American political writers
American YouTubers
American bloggers
American anti-abortion activists
African-American Christians
People from Grovetown, Georgia
Writers from Augusta, Georgia
American child writers
People from Augusta, Georgia
Georgia (U.S. state) Republicans
21st-century African-American people
People associated with the 2020 United States presidential election